The 1997 Indy 200 at Walt Disney World was the third round of the 1996–1997 Indy Racing League. The race was held on January 25, 1997, at the  Walt Disney World Speedway in Bay Lake, Florida, being the first IRL race of the calendar year 1997. It was the first race with the new chassis from Dallara and G-Force, as well as for the 4000 cc naturally aspirated engines supplied by Oldsmobile and Infiniti, and it marked the first time that a major open-wheel series contested a race with brand-new cars and engines. The race was won by Eddie Cheever after being called off on lap 149 of the scheduled 200 due to heavy rain.

Report

Pre-Race
The Indy Racing League was faced with a four-month break between the second and third round, due to the nature of the 1996-97 calendar. This, combined with the addition of rounds at Texas and Pikes Peak that nullified a summer break, the criticism about the Indianapolis 500 overshadowing the co-championship of Buzz Calkins and Scott Sharp, and the majority of motorsport series and potential sponsors following a calendar-based approach, led the teams to complain about the split season. On October 9, it was confirmed that the season would go beyond the Indianapolis 500, ending at the 1997 Las Vegas 500K, and that the series would switch to a calendar-based format for the 1998 season. Thus, the season schedule went from five to nine races. Following a successful test by Team Menard on September 25, with John Paul Jr. subbing for the injured Tony Stewart and Mark Dismore with a fastest lap of 207.61 mph, the IRL confirmed on December 17 a tenth round at Charlotte Motor Speedway, to be held on July 26.

The future of Tony Stewart, who had his sights on a NASCAR ride and missed his Winston Cup debut at Atlanta as a result of the injuries sustained at Las Vegas, was one of the big stories of the winter gap. Being only contracted with Team Menard through the original end of the season at Indianapolis, it was announced on September 17 that he would race full-time in the 1997 NASCAR Winston Cup Series with his Busch Series owner, Harry Ranier. However, the deal fell through a month later, as a clause that estipulated that enough sponsorship for the full season had to be found by mid-October was not fulfilled. During that month, it was reported that Team Green tried to lure Stewart to its KOOL-backed CART operation for 1997, and that General Motors wanted to get Stewart back from Ford by establishing an IRL full-time operation centered around him with Hendrick Motorsports, combined with a partial Busch Series schedule. However, Hendrick denied this information, and both negotiations were reported to have collapsed weeks later.

From September 30 to October 4, USAC organized a five-day test exclusively aimed at driver's tests, conducted with the PDM Racing 'mule' car. A total of 7 drivers passed their test, although only three of them would take part in an IRL race: Robbie Groff, who had two IndyCar races under his belt, USAC Silver Crown  champion Jack Hewitt and ARCA champion and World of Outlaws race-winner Andy Hillenburg. The other four were Formula Atlantic champion Chris Smith, supermodified driver Mike Muldoon and Silver Crown veterans Cary Faas and Jim Keeker. IMSA regular Tom Hessert also passed his test on a conditional basis, and Butch Brickell, recovered from the injuries sustained at Walt Disney World Speedway, only passed two phases. On October 6, John Paul Jr. got the overall win at the 3 Hours of Daytona, the last round of the IMSA GT season, with a handful of other IRL regulars in competition.

Despite reports that the introduction of the new chassis and engine formula could be postponed, testing went ahead as scheduled. With the Riley & Scott chassis being projected to debut at the Texas 500 after having been commissioned by Kelley Automotive Group, whose initial plans were to resell the cars at a later date, the G-Force chassis and the Oldsmobile engine made their debut at Phoenix on November 13–15 with Treadway Racing and Arie Luyendyk running 175 laps, and a best lap in the 162 mph range. Dallara did so on November 25–26 at Walt Disney World with Team Scandia and Eliseo Salazar, who did 203 laps and a best lap of 157 mph. However, by the time of the open test at Walt Disney World on December 10–13, Oldsmobile's engine production had been scarce, and Infiniti was not ready to supply theirs. Arie Luyendyk, Tony Stewart and Scott Sharp were the only drivers to take part, with Luyendyk setting a fastest lap of 166.898 mph. Those tests were the first overseen by the new IRL executive director and vice president Leo Mehl, the former general manager for Goodyear.

On December 17, the litigation between the IRL and CART regarding the use of the "IndyCar" trademark, and the one filled by A. J. Foyt for anti-competitive practices, ended in an out-of-court settlement "without any acknowledgment of fault or liability by any party".  CART agreed to end its licensing agreement with the Indianapolis Motor Speedway and cease use of the term "IndyCar" for their series, but its use by the IRL would be prohibited until 2003, as part of the settlement. That same day, Joie Chitwood Jr. confirmed the formation of a new team, Chitwood Motorsports, with veteran Danny Ongais as a driver, and Treadway Racing followed suit by announcing Scott Goodyear as a driver for their second car, the two-time Indy 500 runner-up having only run partially in IndyCar for the last two years. At the resuming of open tests at Walt Disney World Speedway from December 16–22, Goodyear led the proceedings with a 168.145 mph lap. Stewart, Salazar, Eddie Cheever, John Paul Jr. and Buzz Calkins also tested, while Galles Racing and Davy Jones elected to do so at Phoenix International Raceway.

Testing at Orlando continued throughout the first weeks of January, with 10 drivers taking part, among them Fermín Vélez with Team Scandia. Tony Stewart put a best lap just south of the 170 mph mark (169.795 mph), and Mike Groff debuted the Infiniti engine, getting close to 160 mph in his best effort. They were joined by Buddy Lazier, who got to do some system-check laps with the Infiniti, and Dr. Jack Miller, a veteran Indy Lights competitor who passed his rookie test in the PDM Racing 'mule' car. Miller, known as 'The Racing Dentist' for his full-time job, had arranged a deal with the Arizona Motorsports rental crew to race in 1997. On January 11, Eliseo Salazar lost control of his car after having an engine failure and crashed in Turn 1, suffering a compression fracture in his lower back. Salazar, injured at Orlando for the second year in a row, was ruled out of action "at least until the beginning of May". On January 16, both Jeret Schroeder, a U.S. F2000 champion and top-5 contender in the Atlantic Championship, and Jim Guthrie were confirmed to drive for McCormack Motorsports and Blueprint Racing, respectively.

Practice and qualifying

Further testing was conducted on the week of the race with 11 drivers, among them Roberto Guerrero and Marco Greco, designated by Team Scandia as Salazar's replacement. Tony Stewart logged the fastest lap at 165.975 mph, with Buddy Lazier in close pursuit in his Infiniti-powered car. The entry list was unveiled on January 21 with 22 car/driver combinations, but Mark Dismore, Robbie Buhl and Sam Schmidt were later withdrawn due to the widespread parts shortage that left them out of any winter testing. Davey Hamilton also had to skip winter testing for the same reason, but he remained entered nonetheless. The drivers already confirmed were joined by Stéphan Grégoire driving for a new team, Chastain Motorsports. On Thursday, Stan Wattles announced his plans to become a driver-owner under the Metro Racing System banner he had driven with in Formula Atlantics. The deadline was set for a late 1997 start at the earliest, in anticipation of a full-season effort in 1998.

Thursday practice was dominated by Tony Stewart, who led with a 167.715 mph lap in the morning session and a 165.738 mph lap in the afternoon, with Buzz Calkins and Buddy Lazier trailing him. One hour into the morning session, Davy Jones was second fastest in front of Scott Goodyear when he lost control going into Turn 3 at 11.45 a.m. His car crashed rear first into the concrete wall, skidded across the track and pounded the inside wall. Jones was extricated and airlifted to Orlando Regional Medical Center in critical condition, although he was upgraded to serious a few hours later. He suffered a closed head injury, as well as injuries in his neck's ligaments. Jones underwent a lengthy and successful recovery, and would not race again until the 1999 12 Hours of Sebring. On Friday morning, Galles Racing confirmed that their replacement driver would be Jeff Ward, a former motocross champion and Indy Lights regular who had not driven an Indy car since failing to qualify for the 1995 Indianapolis 500, and had not started an Indy car race.

Tony Stewart completed his practice sweep by leading the morning session with a 167.046 mph over Scott Sharp and Eddie Cheever, and confirmed his dominance on qualifying, where he scored the first pole of his IRL career with a best lap of 166.013 mph. As expected, lap times were significantly slower than in the previous year, with a 15 mph drop between Buddy Lazier's pole from 1996 (181.388 mph) and Stewart's, who was 1.8s slower in sheer lap time. Stewart didn't have as much margin as in practice, where he averaged an advantage of more than 3 mph: three other drivers later went below the 22 second mark, with Arie Luyendyk being the closest of them all at 164.964 mph, and Buzz Calkins, who got out on track at the 11th hour after having fuel pressure issues, ended up 3rd, on what would be the best qualifying effort of his IRL career, in front of Scott Sharp, Eddie Cheever and early favourite Scott Goodyear. Jeff Ward put his new ride in a solid 8th place, while the Infiniti drivers lagged behind: Lazier, who suffered a gearbox failure in the morning, managed to qualify 11th and points leader Mike Groff only ran faster than Jeret Schroeder and Danny Ongais, who had no testing mileage whatsoever.

There were only 16 qualifiers, as three drivers had not had enough running to make an attempt: Roberto Guerrero had not run since suffering an oil system problem in his only test with the Infiniti engine on Wednesday, as a spare engine was not ready in time, while Jack Miller (11 laps, best lap at 84 mph) and Stéphan Grégoire (7 laps, 125 mph) had not run a single lap at speed in their cars Guerrero and Miller were allowed to start the race at the back of the field, but Grégoire was required to take part in the systems-check practice scheduled for Guerrero on raceday. Despite picking up a fuel problem, he got permission from USAC to start the race, where he parked the car after just two laps. Fermín Vélez, who qualified in a career-best 10th place, also participated in the systems check after losing an engine on Friday afternoon practice, changing it for an "Oldsmobile development engine".

  His engine had an oil system problem, and a spare was not ready on time. He was allowed to start the race at the back of the field.
  Elected not to qualify. He was allowed to start the race at the back of the field.

Failed to qualify or withdrew
 Davy Jones for Galles Racing - Replaced by  Jeff Ward R.

Race
Rain fell in the early hours of the day, although the track was dried up 90 minutes before the start of the race. In a cool and cloudy Saturday morning, polesitter Tony Stewart ran away from the start, his pace not being matched by any of his competitors. Jeff Ward had a great start climbing to 5th place, while Eddie Cheever went the opposite way losing two additional spots to Scott Goodyear and a fast-starting Buddy Lazier. Buzz Calkins pressured Arie Luyendyk for second place and eventually passed him on Lap 15, pulling away shortly after. In fourth place, Scott Sharp lacked some pace, and started developing a loose condition around Lap 30. One of his corrections on Lap 32 made Ward lose the three spots he had gained, as he veered out to avoid an incident, and Stewart got to lap that group of cars by Lap 37, his lead having increased to 15 seconds. Sharp eventually started losing places, and had to do his first pit stop on Lap 45, much earlier than intended.

From around Lap 40, smoking was consistently reported out of Calkins' car while braking for Turn 1. Vapor chemtrails coming from the rear wings as a result of the high humidity also caused some confusing reports of smoking for other drivers, among them Stewart. His first pit stop on Lap 65 was a slow one, depriving him of putting a lap on Calkins and Luyendyk. Jeff Ward had problems with his gearbox on his pit stop and slowed on track shortly after, having to retire from the race. After the first round of stops, Cheever was up to fourth place, having passed Scott Goodyear on track on Lap 50 and Buddy Lazier in the pit stop window. Running a race of his own, Stewart got around Luyendyk on Lap 79. Three laps later, Buzz Calkins, who was bound to have the same fate, slowed on track after mistakenly turning off a switch in his car, trying to nurse his engine problems. He got back up to speed shortly after, in third place.

Leading a pack of lapped cars in 13th place, six laps down, rookie Jeret Schroeder spun on his own on the exit of Turn 1 and crashed into the wall. The trail of cars that followed him slowed suddenly, and Arie Luyendyk lost control of his car trying to avoid them, crashing into the inside wall. Both incidents happened at reduced speeds, but the damage took both drivers out of the race, and caused a race-changing caution. With rain looming in the background as a strong possibility, and the race being past the halfway point, most of the drivers elected to do an earlier second pit stop, hoping that rain appeared before Lap 170, with the exception of race leader Tony Stewart, Marco Greco and Jim Guthrie, who stuck to their two-stop strategy. Also, having stopped just before the caution, Scott Sharp restarted the race in front of Scott Goodyear and Buddy Lazier, who passed the Canadian a few laps later, although Sharp would eventually lose position with both drivers within 30 laps.

After his second green-flag pit stop on Lap 130, Stewart rejoined the track some 20 seconds behind Buzz Calkins, and cautiously let Eddie Cheever take second place while running on cold tires, getting by him again on Lap 143. Stewart was trying to make up a 10-second gap with the leader when, two laps later, Calkins slowed on track with a blown engine. That gave the lead back to Stewart, only for him to spun a few seconds later in Turn 3, damaging his rear wing and puncturing his right rear tire against the outside wall. It was thought that the spin had been caused by Stewart running into some debris from Calkins' blown engine, but he later stated that it had been caused by an oil leak in his car. Both drivers retired from the race while the caution was out, and heavy rain started falling on the track less than five minutes after their incidents.

IRL officials brought out the red flag on Lap 149. Eddie Cheever had inherited the lead during the caution, and would be later proclaimed as the winner after the race was called with 51 laps to go. This gave Cheever, who had not led a lap under green flag conditions, his first Indy car win after seven years, and the first for a driver-owner since A. J. Foyt at the 1981 Pocono 500. It also ended a long winless drought in Cheever's career: it was his first win on any series since the 1988 1000 km of Fuji, his first win in an open-wheel car since the 1979 Formula 2 race at Zandvoort, and the first major open-wheel victory of his career, having scored 9 podiums without a win in his ten-year F1 tenure, and another four in CART.

During the caution, Buddy Lazier, Scott Goodyear and Scott Sharp made a pit stop, but Mike Groff, who had run ninth for most of the race, didn't follow suit, gaining three places on all of them for what would be the best finish of his career in second place, extending his championship lead to 10 points over Buzz Calkins. Also, Lazier's pit stop was significantly slower, which made him drop down to fifth place behind Goodyear and Sharp. Marco Greco got his third top 10 finish in a row with his two stop strategy, the same that propelled Jim Guthrie into his best result at that moment in sixth position in front of the unsung Davey Hamilton. Spaniard Fermín Vélez was the last running car in ninth place, in another career-best showing. Despite being credited with a 10th-place finish, Tony Stewart failed to see the checkered flag for the fifth IRL race in a row, having only finished a race in his first start at Orlando the previous year.

Race Statistics
Lead changes: 3 among 3 drivers

Standings after the race

Drivers' Championship standings

 Note: Only the top five positions are included for the standings.

References

External links
IndyCar official website

1996–97 in IndyCar
Indy 200 At Walt Disney World
Walt Disney World
Events at Walt Disney World